Star Wars is a media franchise and shared fictional universe that is the setting of science fiction films produced by Lucasfilm, based on characters created by George Lucas. The Skywalker Saga of the franchise includes nine films, featuring three trilogies; the original trilogy, the prequel trilogy, and the sequel trilogy. The original trilogy began with A New Hope in 1977, followed by The Empire Strikes Back (1980) and Return of the Jedi (1983), while the prequel trilogy consists of The Phantom Menace (1999), Attack of the Clones (2002), and Revenge of the Sith (2005). The sequel trilogy consists of The Force Awakens (2015), The Last Jedi (2017), and The Rise of Skywalker (2019), and chronologically follows Return of the Jedi in the saga. Additionally, an animated film was released in 2008, and two standalone anthology films were released in 2016 and 2018.

The films feature large, sometimes ensemble, casts of actors and actresses, with multiple lead actors. Mark Hamill, Harrison Ford, and Carrie Fisher star as Luke Skywalker, Han Solo, and Leia Organa, respectively, in the original trilogy films. Liam Neeson, Ewan McGregor, Natalie Portman, and Jake Lloyd respectively star as Qui-Gon Jinn, Obi-Wan Kenobi, Padmé Amidala and Anakin Skywalker in The Phantom Menace, with McGregor and Portman returning for its two sequels and Hayden Christensen playing the older Anakin in them. Ford, Hamill, Fisher, and other cast members from the original trilogy returned to reprise their roles and co-star alongside Adam Driver as Kylo Ren, Daisy Ridley as Rey and John Boyega as Finn in the sequel trilogy films. Matt Lanter portrays Anakin in the animated film The Clone Wars (2008), Felicity Jones portrays Jyn Erso in Rogue One (2016), and Alden Ehrenreich portrays a young Han Solo in Solo: A Star Wars Story (2018).

Anthony Daniels is the only actor to have appear in all films in the franchise, appearing as C-3PO in all except Solo, in which he appeared as Tak. Multiple other cast members recur across multiple films and series within the franchise. The list below is sorted by film and the character's surname, as some characters have been portrayed by multiple actors. All characters that have made appearances in other Star Wars media, such as the television series or television films, are noted.

The Skywalker Saga

Other films

See also
 Lists of Star Wars cast members
 List of Star Wars television series actors
 Star Wars Holiday Special actors
 Caravan of Courage: An Ewok Adventure actors
 Ewoks: The Battle for Endor actors

References

General references

External links

Lists of actors by film series
Film actors